Richard Cohn (born 1955) is a music theorist and Battell Professor of Music Theory at Yale. He was previously chair of the department of music at the University of Chicago.

Early in his career, he specialized in the music of Béla Bartók, but more recently has written about Neo-Riemannian theory, metric dissonance, equal divisions of the octave, and chromatic harmony. In 1994, he won the Society for Music Theory's Outstanding Publication Award for his article, "Transpositional Combination of Beat-Class Sets in Steve Reich’s Phase-Shifting Music," and he won it again in 1997 for "Maximally Smooth Cycles, Hexatonic Systems, and the Analysis of Late-Romantic Triadic Progressions."

Cohn was the founding editor (2004–14) of Oxford Studies in Music Theory, and is the current editor of Journal of Music Theory.  He is the author of Audacious Euphony: Chromatic Harmony and the Triad's Second Nature (Oxford, 2012).

Sources

External links
 Yale Department of Music: People: Faculty

American music theorists
Yale University faculty
Living people
1955 births